In mathematics, specifically in algebraic topology, the cup product is a method of adjoining two cocycles of degree p and q to form a composite cocycle of degree p + q.  This defines an associative (and distributive) graded commutative product operation in  cohomology, turning the cohomology of a space X into a graded ring, H∗(X), called the cohomology ring.  The cup product was introduced in work of J. W. Alexander, Eduard Čech and Hassler Whitney from 1935–1938, and, in full generality, by Samuel Eilenberg in 1944.

Definition
In singular cohomology, the cup product is a construction giving a product on the graded cohomology ring H∗(X) of a topological space X.

The construction starts with a product of cochains: if  is a p-cochain and 
 is a q-cochain, then 

where σ is a singular (p + q) -simplex and  

The cup product of two cocycles is again a cocycle, and the product of a coboundary with a cocycle (in either order) is a coboundary.  The cup product operation induces a bilinear operation on cohomology,

Properties
The cup product operation in cohomology satisfies the identity

so that the corresponding multiplication is graded-commutative.

The cup product is functorial, in the following sense:  if 

is a continuous function, and 

is the induced homomorphism in cohomology, then 

for all classes α, β in H *(Y). In other words, f * is a (graded) ring homomorphism.

Interpretation

This composition passes to the quotient to give a well-defined map in terms of cohomology, this is the cup product. This approach explains the existence of a cup product for cohomology but not for homology:  induces a map  but would also induce a map , which goes the wrong way round to allow us to define a product. This is however of use in defining the cap product.

Bilinearity follows from this presentation of cup product, i.e.  and

Examples
Cup products may be used to distinguish manifolds from wedges of spaces with identical cohomology groups. The space  has the same cohomology groups as the torus T, but with a different cup product.

Other definitions

Cup product and differential forms
In de Rham cohomology, the cup product of differential forms is induced by the wedge product. In other words, the wedge product of
two closed differential forms belongs to the de Rham class of the cup product of the two original de Rham classes.

Cup product and geometric intersections

For oriented manifolds, there is a geometric heuristic  that "the cup product is dual to intersections."

Indeed,  let  be an oriented  smooth manifold of dimension . If two submanifolds   of codimension  and  intersect transversely, then their intersection  is again a submanifold of codimension .  By taking the images of the fundamental homology classes of these manifolds under inclusion, one can obtain a bilinear product on homology.  This product is  Poincaré dual to the cup product, in the sense that taking the Poincaré pairings  then there is  the following equality :

.

Similarly, the linking number can be defined in terms of intersections, shifting dimensions by 1, or alternatively in terms of a non-vanishing cup product on the complement of a link.

Massey products

The cup product is a binary (2-ary) operation; one can define a ternary (3-ary) and higher order operation called the Massey product, which generalizes the cup product. This is a higher order cohomology operation, which is only partly defined (only defined for some triples).

See also
Singular homology
Homology theory
Cap product
Massey product
Torelli group

References

 James R. Munkres, "Elements of Algebraic Topology", Perseus Publishing, Cambridge Massachusetts (1984)  (hardcover)  (paperback)
 Glen E. Bredon, "Topology and Geometry", Springer-Verlag, New York (1993) 
 Allen Hatcher, "Algebraic Topology", Cambridge Publishing Company (2002) 

Homology theory
Algebraic topology
Binary operations